Martin M. Looney (born July 23, 1948) is an American politician. Looney, a Democrat, has been a state senator from Connecticut since 1993. From 2003 to 2014, Looney served as Majority Leader of the Senate; in 2015 he became President Pro Tempore of the Senate.

Looney, a resident of New Haven, represents the eastern half of the city as well as parts of Hamden and North Haven in the Connecticut Senate. He is also a part-time professor at Quinnipiac University and the University of New Haven in Hamden, CT and West Haven, CT, respectively, where he teaches classes such as State and Local Governments.

Looney was born in New Haven and graduated from Fairfield University and later received his M.A. in English from University of Connecticut followed by his J.D. from University of Connecticut School of Law Prior to being elected to the Connecticut Senate, Looney served as a Connecticut state representative.  In 2001, Looney lost to incumbent John DeStefano Jr. in the Democratic primary for mayor of New Haven.

In July 2016, Looney said he would "certainly" consider running for Governor of Connecticut if incumbent Lieutenant Governor Nancy Wyman decided not to run in the 2018 election.

References

External links
Martin Looneyofficial website
Connecticut General Assembly - Martin M. Looney bills introduced
Project Vote Smart - Representative Martin Looney (CT) profile
Follow the Money - Martin M Looney
2006 2004 2002 2000 1998 1996 campaign contributions

|-

|-

|-

1948 births
21st-century American politicians
Democratic Party Connecticut state senators
Fairfield University alumni
Living people
Democratic Party members of the Connecticut House of Representatives
University of Connecticut School of Law alumni